Zena is a census-designated place (CDP) in Delaware County, Oklahoma, United States, along State Highway 127. The population was 122 at the 2010 census.  Established on Courthouse Prairie in District 5 of the old Indian Territory, its post office existed from April 11, 1896, until January 31, 1956. It is said to have been named for Asenith Wood, the wife of the first postmaster.

Geography
Zena is located at  (36.527783, -94.845378).

Demographics

As of the census of 2010, there were 122 people residing in Zena.  The population density was 35 people per square mile (13.5/km2).  There were 91 housing units at an average density of 24/sq mi (9/km2).  The racial makeup of the CDP was 58.54% White, 26.83% Native American, and 14.63% from two or more races. Hispanic or Latino of any race were 0.81% of the population.

There were 50 households, out of which 30.0% had children under the age of 18 living with them, 72.0% were married couples living together, 4.0% had a female householder with no husband present, and 20.0% were non-families. 20.0% of all households were made up of individuals, and 10.0% had someone living alone who was 65 years of age or older. The average household size was 2.46 and the average family size was 2.78.

In the CDP, the population was spread out, with 23.6% under the age of 18, 7.3% from 18 to 24, 26.8% from 25 to 44, 26.8% from 45 to 64, and 15.4% who were 65 years of age or older. The median age was 42 years. For every 100 females, there were 83.6 males. For every 100 females age 18 and over, there were 84.3 males.

The median income for a household in the CDP was $12,500, and the median income for a family was $13,750. Males had a median income of $40,179 versus $9,231 for females. The per capita income for the CDP was $7,656. There were 59.6% of families and 69.8% of the population living below the poverty line, including 86.4% of under eighteens and 80.0% of those over 64.

References

Further reading
 Shirk, George H. Oklahoma Place Names; University of Oklahoma Press; Norman, Oklahoma; 1987: .

Census-designated places in Delaware County, Oklahoma
Census-designated places in Oklahoma